The Centennial Flame is a monument on Parliament Hill commemorating the 100th anniversary of the Canadian Confederation. First lit in January 1967, the Flame worked with natural gas and as of 2021 uses biogas, presenting a fountain that does not freeze in winter. Money thrown into it is a donation for people with disabilities, some of whom have received over $5,000.

History 
The Centennial Flame was first lit as the climax of the centennial celebrations of January 1, 1967, in the presence of the Prime Minister, Lester B. Pearson. He was joined on the hill by leader of the Opposition and former Prime Minister, John Diefenbaker, and Secretary of State Judy LaMarsh, as well as thousands of onlookers. The Flame is fuelled by natural gas and surrounded by a fountain whose ledge contains the shields of Canada's 13 provinces and territories—Nunavut was originally absent as it was not created until 1999. On December 13, 2017, a Nunavut plaque was unveiled.

This Flame was erected as a temporary monument, but due to great public support was made permanent. In 2021 it began burning biogas, near the Queen's Gates (the centre gate). It is located in front of the stairs leading to the Peace Tower and Centre Block, the latter of which is home to the House of Commons and the Senate. The Centennial was celebrated across Canada in various ways, including a re-enactment of the Battle of the Thames and a building of a destroyer out of match sticks. The government also encouraged the building of a Centennial memorial in each of Canada's 10 provinces. The provincial and federal governments matched whatever the municipal government spent on their memorial, thereby encouraging the construction of grand buildings such as the National Arts Centre in Ottawa.

Design 
The monument is encompassed by a fountain into which many visitors to Parliament Hill throw coins for luck. That change is gathered, washed, dried and sorted by maintenance before it is put into a government bank account. From there the money is given to the winner of the Centennial Flame Research Award. The award, which was begun in 2005, is given "to a person with a disability to enable him or her to conduct research and prepare a report on the contributions of one or more Canadians with disabilities to the public life of Canada or the activities of Parliament." The 2011 recipient, Andrew Morrison-Gurza, received $5,500. The 2012 recipient, Andrew St. Kitts, was a Masters student with cerebral palsy who planned on using the $5,000 he received to research "attitudes of able-bodied Canadians when they see people like him."

Because of the fire that burns above the water, the fountain does not freeze, even in the middle of the winter.

The flame is often confused for an eternal flame; however, it does not burn eternally. It may sometimes be extinguished due to bad weather or for maintenance purposes. In 2002, for example, during the G8 protest, Prime Minister Jean Chrétien decided to have the flame extinguished and the monument covered to avoid damage. It was covered by a welded steel lid attached to concrete.

References

Sources 

 
 
 Public Works and Government Services Canada – Centennial Flame

Centennial anniversaries
Eternal flames
Monuments and memorials in Ottawa
Tourist attractions in Ottawa
1967 establishments in Ontario